Tiassé Koné (born 11 October 1981) is a former Ivorian international footballer, who played as a goalkeeper.

Career
Koné was born in Touba, Ivory Coast. In 2007, he won the Ivory Coast Premier Division with Africa Sports for the first time since 1999. In January 2008, he made the step to Spartak Nalchik. After six months in Russia, he moved to Belgian Second Division team UR Namur in July 2008, where he played until November. Being unable to find his way into the starting eleven, he then was released from his contract. For the 2009 season, he went back to his home squad Africa Sports, where he had to compete with young keeper Okoua for the role as main keeper. In 2010, he left Africa Sports to join Issia Wazy.

International career
He was called up to the Ivory Coast national football team for the 2008 Africa Cup of Nations, being the only locally based player in the Ivorian squad.

References

1987 births
Living people
Ivorian footballers
Ivory Coast international footballers
2008 Africa Cup of Nations players
Association football goalkeepers
PFC Spartak Nalchik players
Africa Sports d'Abidjan players
Ivorian expatriate footballers
Ivorian expatriate sportspeople in Belgium
Expatriate footballers in Russia
Issia Wazy players
Expatriate footballers in Belgium
Footballers from Abidjan